Yuri Gorbachev (born August 27, 1987), better known as Yuri Bessmertny, is a Belarusian Muay Thai kickboxer who competes in the middleweight and super middleweight divisions. After taking up Muay Thai at thirteen years old, he began his career in 2004 and rose to prominence by becoming a five-time national champion at both amateur and professional levels. Having established himself domestically, he then went on to win numerous European, intercontinental and world titles while fighting mostly in the former Soviet Union. In 2011, he won the Fight Code Dragon Series tournament featuring sixteen top 72.5 kg/160 lb fighters from around the world to break into the middleweight elite.

Early life
Although born as Yuri Gorbachev, he fights under the surname Bessmertny, which means "immortal" in Belarusian. He began practicing Muay Thai at the age of thirteen at the encouragement of his mother and considers legendary boxer Roy Jones Jr. an idol of his.

Career
After amassing around seventy bouts in amateur competition, Bessmertny turned professional and soon became a five-time national champion, three times under Oriental rules and twice in Muay Thai. Having outgrown the domestic scene, he then started fighting around the former Soviet Union and became a world champion for the first time in 2006 when he won the S-1 title in Poland.

He debuted in the K-1 promotion on March 17, 2007, competing in the K-1 East Europe MAX 2007 eight-man tournament in Vilnius, Lithuania. After beating local fighter Romualdas Klimavičius on points in the quarter-finals, he was eliminated in the semis when he lost to Moldova's Andrey Vakarash after an extension round. Various other belts would then follow as Bessmertny took the WAKO European title and the WMF world title in 2007, the WAKO world title in 2008, the WAKO World Cup in 2009, the World Kickboxing Federation (WKF) intercontinental title in 2010 and the World Fights of Kick Boxing (WFKB) world title in 2011.

In 2011, Bessmertny was invited to compete in the Fight Code Dragon Series, a sixteen-man -72.5 kg/160 lb tournament held throughout Europe that year. At the competition's opening round in Budapest, Hungary on May 1, 2011, he outpointed Selmedin Didic to book his place in the quarter-finals where he was forced to fight Armen Petrosyan twice. The pair first met in Marseille, France, on October 15, 2011, with Bessmertny coming away with a controversial split decision win. As the Petrosyan camp disputed the decision, a rematch was set for Geneva, Switzerland on November 26, 2011, and Bessmertny put a decisive end to the bout this time. Petrosyan came out aggressive in round one but was caught with a counter punch and knocked down. After beating the referee's count, the Italian kept up the aggression and was hit with a vicious right hook again, this time knocking him out.

The semi-finals and the final of the tournament were both held on the same night on December 17, 2011, in Debrecen, Hungary. Bessmertny floored local fighter Norbert Balogh in rounds one and three en route to a unanimous decision win in the semis and came up against Thai star Sudsakorn Sor Klinmee in the final. Sudsakorn struggled with stamina problems throughout and Bessmertny was able to pick him apart over the three rounds to take another unanimous points victory, earning himself the tournament title and $80,000 in prize money.

Coming off of the Fight Code tournament win, Bessmertny broke into the top ten in the world rankings for the first time in January 2012, placing at #7. In his first bout as a world-ranked fighter, he took on former K-1 standout Gago Drago at Thai Boxe Mania in Turin, Italy, on February 24, 2012. After outstriking Drago for two rounds, Bessmertny landed a high kick in the third which sent the Armenian faceplanting unconscious into the canvas. He was then expected to face Fabio Sicilliani at Oktagon 2012 in Milan, Italy, on March 24, 2012 but Sicilliani was replaced by Cristian Milea. Bessmertny won via technical knockout in round three due to a corner stoppage.

Bessmertny returned to Fight Code to compete in the 2012 Dragons Series, which was expanded to thirty-two participants, and took a lackluster points win over Edvin Erik Kibus at the opening stage in his hometown of Minsk on April 14, 2012. He would be unable to defend his crown, however, as the promotion held just one more event before going out of business.

In his next outing, he fought to a draw with Issam Reghi at La Nuit des Challenges 11 in Lyon, France, on June 2, 2012 and, having gone undefeated in the first half of the year, moved up to #5 in the world rankings in July 2012.

He was scheduled to fight Abraham Roqueñi at Nitrianska Noc Bojovnikov in Nitra, Slovakia on October 27, 2012, but pulled out of the fight due to injury. Bessmertny made his return against Roberto Cocco at a weight of 75 kg/165 lb at another Thai Boxe Mania event in Torino on November 24, 2012, and won by TKO due to a cut in round two. Even though the cut was caused by an accidental headbutt, Bessmertny was given the win rather than the bout being made a no contest. Having not picked up a win in the -72.5 kg/160 lb division in eight months, Bessmertny dropped out of the middleweight world rankings in December 2012.

Bessmertny took on his second Thai opponent in the form of Aikpracha Meenayothin in the semi-finals of a four-man tournament at La Nuit des Titans 2013 in Tours, France, on February 2, 2013. Although he was bettered in round one and three, Bessmertny managed to score a standing eight count in the second which resulted in the bout being called a draw and taking it into an extension round. In the fourth round, however, Aikpracha was just too much and took the decision.

Dropping down to 70 kg/154 lb, he lost a unanimous decision to Ashihara karate stylist Davit Kiria at Glory 7: Milan in Milan on April 20, 2013. In the semi-finals of the -71 kg/156 lb tournament at the Legend Fighting Show in Moscow, Russia on May 25, 2013, he lost to Artur Kyshenko by unanimous decision after an extra round. Bessmertny was to fight in the WKN Big 8 Tournament 2013 in Minsk, Belarus on June 3, 2013, and meet Dmitry Valent in the quarter-finals but it fell through. He instead took on Karim Ghajji at Time Fight 3 in Tours, France, on June 15, 2013, and his slow start was once again his downfall as he lost by unanimous decision for the third consecutive time. He lost to Steve Moxon by UD at Kings of Kombat 10 in Melbourne, Australia on September 7, 2013. On October 11, 2013, Bessmertny was outpointed bt Djimé Coulibaly at Warriors Night in Issy-les-Moulineaux, France.

He put an end to his five-fight losing skid when he defeated Warren Stevelmans by UD at Thai Boxe Mania in Turin, Italy on January 25, 2014. Following this, he knocked out Abdallah Mabel in round two at Nitrianska Noc Bojovníkov in Nitra on March 1, 2014. Bessmertny lost to Andy Souwer via UD at Legend 3: Pour Homme in Milan on April 5, 2014.

Championships and awards

Kickboxing
Belarusian Kickboxing
Belarusian Kickboxing Championship (Three times)
Belarusian Muay Thai Championship (Two times)
Fight Code
Fight Code Dragon Series (-72.5 kg/160 lb) 2011 Championship
S-1
S-1 World Championship
World Association of Kickboxing Organizations
2013 W.A.K.O. Pro K-1 Rules Middleweight World Champion -75 kg
WAKO European Championship
WAKO World Championship
2009 WAKO World Cup Championship
World Fights of Kick Boxing
WFKB World Championship
World Kickboxing Federation
WKF Intercontinental -72.3 kg/159.394 lb Championship
World Muaythai Federation
WMF World Championship

Kickboxing record

|-  style="background:#cfc;"
| 2019-10-12|| Win ||align=left| Giuseppe De Domenico || Bellator Kickboxing 12 || Italy || Decision (Unanimous) || 3 || 3:00
|-  style="background:#fbb;" 
| 2019-07-08 || Loss ||align=left| Sher Mamazulunov || Fair Fight IX || Yekaterinburg, Russia ||Decision (Unanimous) || 5 || 3:00
|-  style="background:#cfc;"
| 2019-04-26 || Win ||align=left| Juncheng Chang || Tatneft Cup || Russia || Decision || 4 || 3:00
|-  style="background:#cfc;"
| 2018-12-01|| Win ||align=left|  Karim Ghajji|| Bellator Kickboxing 11|| Italy || Decision (Unanimous) || 3 || 3:00
|-  style="background:#cfc;"
| 2018-09-22 || Win ||align=left| Maxim Vorovski || Nr1 Fight Show || Estonia || Decision || 3 || 3:00
|-
|-  style="background:#fbb;" 
| 2018-02-24 || Loss ||align=left| Djibril Ehouo || |ACB KB 13: From Paris with war  || Paris, France || Decision (Unanimous) || 3 || 3:00
|- style="background:#c5d2ea;"
| 2017-10-14|| Draw ||align=left| Vladimír Moravčík || Rebuy Stars Fight Night || Slovakia || Draw || 3 || 3:00
|-  style="background:#cfc;"
| 2017-03-25 || Win ||align=left| Djibril Ehouo || ACB KB 9: Showdown in Paris || Paris, France || Decision || 3 || 3:00
|-  style="background:#cfc;"
| 2017-01-28 || Win ||align=left| Alassane SY || Thai Boxe Mania 2017 || Turin, Italy || Decision|| 3 || 3:00
|-  style="background:#cfc;"
| 2016-12-10 || Win ||align=left| Denis Apăvăloaie || KOK World GP in Moldova Vol. 42 || Chisinau, Moldova ||  KO || 2 || 2:29
|- 
|-  style="background:#fbb;" 
| 2016-10-16 || Loss ||align=left| Duoli Chen || |ACB KB 8: Only The Braves || Hoofddorp, Netherlands || Decision || 3 || 3:00
|-
|-  style="background:#fbb;" 
| 2016-06-10 || Loss ||align=left| Walid Haddad || A-ONE WGP, Semi Finals || Toulon, France || Decision || 3 || 3:00
|-
|-  style="background:#fbb;"
| 2014-10-23 || Loss ||align=left| Cedric Doumbe || A1 WCC Lyon, Semi Finals  || Lyon, France || TKO (cut) || 3 || 
|-  style="background:#cfc;"
| 2014-05-27 || Win ||align=left| Balgobind Ajay || Mix Fighter || Minsk, Belarus || Ext. R. TKO || 4 || 
|-  style="background:#fbb;"
| 2014-04-05 || Loss ||align=left| Andy Souwer || Legend 3: Pour Homme || Milan, Italy || Decision (unanimous) || 3 || 3:00
|-  style="background:#cfc;"
| 2014-03-01 || Win ||align=left| Abdallah Mabel || Nitrianska Noc Bojovníkov || Nitra, Slovakia || KO || 2 || 
|-  style="background:#cfc;"
| 2014-01-25 || Win ||align=left| Warren Stevelmans || Thai Boxe Mania || Turin, Italy || Decision (unanimous) || 3 || 3:00
|-  style="background:#fbb;"
| 2013-10-11 || Loss ||align=left| Djimé Coulibaly || Warriors Night || Issy-les-Moulineaux, France || Decision || 3 || 3:00
|-  style="background:#fbb;"
| 2013-09-07 || Loss ||align=left| Steve Moxon || Kings of Kombat 10 || Melbourne, Australia || Decision (unanimous) || 3 || 3:00
|-  style="background:#fbb;"
| 2013-06-15 || Loss ||align=left| Karim Ghajji || Time Fight 3 || Tours, France || Decision (unanimous) || 3 || 3:00
|-  style="background:#fbb;"
| 2013-05-25 || Loss ||align=left| Artur Kyshenko || Legend Fighting Show, Semi Finals || Moscow, Russia || Extension round decision (unanimous) || 4 || 3:00
|-  style="background:#fbb;"
| 2013-04-20 || Loss ||align=left| Davit Kiria || Glory 7: Milan || Milan, Italy || Decision (unanimous) || 3 || 3:00
|-  style="background:#cfc;"
| 2013-03-09 || Win ||align=left| Aleksandr Zakharov || Monte Carlo Fighting Masters || Monte Carlo, Monaco || Decision || 5 || 3:00
|-
! style=background:white colspan=9 |
|-  style="background:#fbb;"
| 2013-02-02 || Loss ||align=left| Aikpracha Meenayothin || La Nuit des Titans 2013, Semi Finals || Tours, France || Extension round decision || 4 || 3:00
|-  style="background:#cfc;"
| 2012-11-24 || Win ||align=left| Roberto Cocco || Thai Boxe Mania || Turin, Italy || TKO (cut) || 2 || 
|- style="background:#c5d2ea;"
| 2012-06-02 || Draw ||align=left| Issam Reghi || La Nuit des Challenges 11 || Lyon, France || Draw || 5 || 3:00
|-  style="background:#cfc;"
| 2012-04-14 || Win ||align=left| Edvin Erik Kibus || Fight Code Dragon Series 2012 Part 2, First Round || Minsk, Belarus || Decision (unanimous) || 3 || 3:00
|-  style="background:#cfc;"
| 2012-03-24 || Win ||align=left| Cristian Milea || Oktagon 2012 || Milan, Italy || TKO (corner stoppage) || 3 || 
|-  style="background:#cfc;"
| 2012-02-05 || Win ||align=left| Gago Drago || Thai Boxe Mania || Turin, Italy || KO (right high kick) || 3 || 
|-  style="background:#cfc;"
| 2011-12-17 || Win ||align=left| Sudsakorn Sor Klinmee || Fight Code Dragon Series 2011 Part 5, Final || Debrecen, Hungary || Decision (unanimous) || 3 || 3:00
|-
! style=background:white colspan=9 |
|-  style="background:#cfc;"
| 2011-12-17 || Win ||align=left| Norbert Balogh || Fight Code Dragon Series 2011 Part 5, Semi Finals || Debrecen, Hungary || Decision (unanimous) || 3 || 3:00
|-  style="background:#cfc;"
| 2011-11-26 || Win ||align=left| Armen Petrosyan || Fight Code Rhinos Series 2011 Part 5, Quarter Finals || Geneva, Switzerland || KO (right hook) || 1 || 
|-  style="background:#cfc;"
| 2011-10-15 || Win ||align=left| Armen Petrosyan || Fight Code Dragon Series 2011 Part 4, Quarter Finals || Marseille, France || Decision (split) || 3 || 3:00
|-  style="background:#fbb;"
| 2011-05-28 || Loss ||align=left| Amin Choukoud || Tatneft Cup 2011 Part 6, Semi Finals || Kazan, Russia || Decision (unanimous) || 4 || 3:00
|-  style="background:#cfc;"
| 2011-05-01 || Win ||align=left| Selmedin Didic || Fight Code Dragon Series 2011 Part 3, First Round || Budapest, Hungary || Decision || 3 || 3:00
|-  style="background:#cfc;"
| 2011-02-12 || Win ||align=left| Anthony Kane || Tatneft Cup 2011 Part 3, Quarter Finals || Kazan, Russia || Decision (unanimous) || 4 || 3:00
|-  style="background:#cfc;"
| 2010-12-30 || Win ||align=left| Antoli Hunanyan || Heroe's Gate || Prague, Czech Republic || TKO || 5 || 
|-
! style=background:white colspan=9 |
|-  style="background:#fbb;"
| 2009-06-25 || Loss ||align=left| Kumar Zhaliev || WBKF European -76 kg/167 lb Championships, Semi Finals || Moscow, Russia || Decision (unanimous) || 3 || 3:00
|-  style="background:#fbb;"
| 2009-04-16 || Loss ||align=left| Urunbeck Esenkulov || Tatneft Cup 2009 Part 5, Semi Finals || Kazan, Russia || Decision (unanimous) || 3 || 3:00
|-  style="background:#cfc;"
| 2009-01-31 || Win ||align=left| Akhmed Oligov || Tatneft Cup 2009 Part 3, Quarter Finals || Kazan, Russia || KO (right hook) || 3 || 
|-  style="background:#cfc;"
| 2008-11-01 || Win ||align=left| Temur Hudoyan || Gladiators 2 || Ufa, Russia || TKO (cut) || 4 || 
|-  style="background:#fbb;"
| 2008-06-28 || Loss ||align=left| Vladimír Moravčík || PROFILIGA Muay Thai VII || Banská Bystrica, Slovakia || Decision || 5 || 3:00
|-  style="background:#cfc;"
| 2007-12-19 || Win ||align=left| Sergey Stoyanov || WBKF European -76 kg/167 lb Championships, Semi Finals || Moscow, Russia || KO || 1 || 
|-  style="background:#cfc;"
| 2007-05-16 || Win ||align=left| Sergey Stoyanov || Fight Club Arabat || Moscow, Russia || Decision (unanimous) || 3 || 3:00
|-  style="background:#fbb;"
| 2007-03-17 || Loss ||align=left| Andrey Vakarash || K-1 East Europe MAX 2007, Semi Finals || Vilnius, Lithuania || Extension round decision || 3 || 3:00
|-  style="background:#cfc;"
| 2007-03-17 || Win ||align=left| Romualdas Klimavičius || K-1 East Europe MAX 2007, Quarter Finals || Vilnius, Lithuania || Decision || 3 || 3:00
|-  style="background:#cfc;"
| 2004-11-30 || Win ||align=left| Marat Gereev || Russian Muaythai League || Moscow, Russia || TKO || 5 || 
|-
| colspan=9 | Legend:

References

External links
 Official Fight Code profile
 Fight Life profile

1987 births
Living people
Belarusian male kickboxers
Middleweight kickboxers
Belarusian Muay Thai practitioners
Sportspeople from Minsk